Fort Ritchie in Cascade, Maryland was a military installation southwest of Blue Ridge Summit, Pennsylvania and southeast of Waynesboro in the area of South Mountain. Following the 1995 Base Realignment and Closure Commission, it closed in 1998.

History

Buena Vista Ice Company
About 1889, the Buena Vista Ice Company of Philadelphia purchased 400 acres of the land on which most of Fort Ritchie now stands. The company planned to cut natural ice from a manmade lake and ship it to Baltimore, Washington, and southern markets via the Western Maryland Railroad's Baltimore-Hagerstown line. The first lake was created in approximately 1901 and named Lake Royer (the "Lower Lake").

A railroad spur off the Western Maryland line was built alongside the southeastern shore of Lake Royer. Unfortunately, the locomotives' exhaust laid soot on the ice in the lake, so a second lake (the "Upper Lake") was constructed far enough away from the track so that the ice would remain clean for cutting. Lake Royer also served as a recreational spot during the summer tourist season. Demand for natural ice declined over the years, and the Buena Vista Ice Company discontinued operations at the site.

Maryland National Guard
In 1926, the Maryland National Guard investigated several locations in searching for a new summer training camp. A decision in favor of the ice company property was primarily based upon its proximity to the Western Maryland Railroad and the telegraph line. The property also was attractive to Adjunct General Milton Reckord because it’s altitude and position in the Blue Ridge Mountains could ward off hot Summer temperatures and mosquitoes, unlike other areas of the state. The Camp was named after popular Maryland Governor Albert Ritchie. The site was controlled by the Maryland National Guard from 1926–1942 and then again from 1946-1951.

Camp Ritchie
Camp Ritchie had German and Italian POW Camps during 1942–1947, housing mostly Africa Corps Officers and Italians captured during Operation Torch. 

The US Army activated the Military Intelligence Training Center (MITC) on June 19, 1942, and trained 19,600 intelligence troops, including the Ritchie Boys, approximately 15,200 servicemen, most with high fluency in multiple European languages, for frontlines interrogation, battle-field intelligence, investigation, counter-intelligence, and related work.  Approximately 14%, or 2,200, of them were Jewish refugees born in Germany and Austria, alongside American Jewish servicemen, among others. The 'Ritchie Boys' were later involved in the Nuremberg trials as prosecutors and translators.

Nisei women joined the Military Intelligence Service as translators and interrogators and attended a rigorous six-month study course designed to educate women on the Japanese military language. Upon graduation, most of the women were assigned to the Pacific Military Intelligence Research Section at Camp Ritchie, Maryland, and worked with Japanese documents to uncover military plans.

Naval Unit, Air Technical Document Research Unit, Camp Ritchie, Maryland was a United States Navy shore activity during World War II. 3rd Mobile Radio Broadcast Company activated December 29, 1943, at Camp Ritchie.

Following the War, Camp Ritchie was involved with yet another top secret effort known as 'The Hill Project' in which German POWs were responsible for working directly with Allied forces to conduct research on "subjects which will aid in preserving military security in Europe'; research "in prosecuting the war against Japan'(A goal which proved to be unnecessary following their surrender); and research in "improving intelligence organization and techniques and to other selected matters on which important lessons can be gained from studying German methods in detail". While only 150 POWs worked directly on the Hill Project, many of them high ranking of the Wehrmacht, it is estimated that by March 1946, over 1500 POWs were at Ritchie and actively involved during the scope of the Project.

Closure
Support for Raven Rock Mountain Complex transferred to Fort Detrick on October 1, 1997. Fort Ritchie closed in 1998 under the 1995 Base Realignment and Closure Commission. The property was sold to Corporate Office Properties Trust (COPT) for mixed-use development. As the 2007 recession pressed on, PenMar Development Corporation took back ownership of the property in 2012. Fort Ritchie housed a military preparatory academy under the direction of Dr. Robert Alexander; National Role Models Academy, also known as "College Corps", 2000–02.

After that, the PenMar board worked to have Fort Ritchie designated as a "sustainable community" by the State of Maryland, which would have qualified the property for tax advantages and grants.  The property had been cleaned up and a new project manager was hired to market the property in an effort to bring back some of the jobs lost when the Army departed.  Several alternative uses for the property were being explored which would have created a mix of uses that were to have included residential, commercial, recreational, and some office/light industrial uses.

Ultimately, PenMar fell into financial ruin and the grounds were returned to the Washington County government which generally viewed the site as a financial loss. In an attempt to stop the monetary hemorrhaging, several members of the Washington County government travelled to South Korea in connection with a contractor called JGBLI which secured approximately 60 acres of ground on the opposing side of Lake Royer for development. The manner in which that land was transferred was highly controversial, with many residents and politicians citing violations of Maryland's public meeting laws. Many Cascade residents who had lived on the site for decades were forced to move despite the fact that their homes were not directly affected by the sale. After many failed attempts to come to an agreement on how the premises would be developed, JGBLI backed out of the total purchase of Fort Ritchie. Subsequent to this, several individuals came forward in an attempt to secure the grounds for themselves, including a vineyard owner from Potomac, Maryland, and the Maryland Department of Natural Resources. In 2020 Fort Ritchie was planned to be sold to John Krumpotich, a local resident, for the cost of 1.85 million dollars. Krumpotich had made statements to the effect that he would like to preserve most of the Fort while making some of the property mixed use development in order to breathe life back into the quiet mountain town.

In March 2020, a lawsuit was filed against the county government and Krumpotich by a property investor from Frederick County, Maryland. A court ruled in favor of Krumpotich and the county; however, an appeal was filed. As of June 30, 2020, the transfer of the property to Krumpotich had been further delayed due to an appeal. According to a news article in local news outlet Herald-Mail Media, "A Washington County official said Tuesday that resolving litigation affecting the sale of the former Fort Ritchie Army base should be wrapped up within a year, possibly sooner."

Revival
On April 7, 2021, John Krumpotich became the owner of Fort Ritchie and has expressed his plans to revive Ritchie and the Cascade community by bringing businesses, historic preservation, and housing to the former 500+/- acre army post. Krumpotich has stated that it is a "paramount priority" to rehabilitate the stone structures on site to maintain its historic integrity while bringing each building back to life.

See also
 Ritchie Boys
 Raven Rock Mountain Complex

References

External links

Closed installations of the United States Army
Buildings and structures in Washington County, Maryland
Historic American Engineering Record in Maryland